The Munich derby is the name given to football matches between FC Bayern Munich and TSV 1860 Munich, both of them from Munich, Germany.

History

Early years (1902–1933)
Although the TSV has existed since 1860, a football section was founded in 1899. In contrast, Bayern was founded by members of a Munich gymnastics club. The first ever Munich derby was contested in September 1902. In the first years, Bayern mainly won the derbies. However, since football in Germany was organised on a very regional level in this time, the rivalry was not very pronounced since both team played against many other Munich-based teams such as FC Wacker München or 1. Münchner FC 1896. At the end of this period, both clubs became more and more successful: 1860 entered the final of the German football championship in 1931 (but lost against Hertha BSC) and Bayern won against Eintracht Frankfurt one year later. In 1933, 1860 reached the final of the Southern German championship.

The Nazi period (1933–1945)
With beginning of the Nazi era in Germany, both clubs were put in the newly founded Gauliga Bayern. In this period, Bayern suffered because many Jewish members, such as Kurt Landauer were forced to leave the club. In contrast, 1860 was less affected by the enforcement of the Aryan paragraph. Particularly during the war time, 1860 became successful: They won their first national trophy the Tschammerpokal (today known as the German Cup)  in 1942. 1860 returned to the national playoffs in 1943, reaching the quarter-finals.

Increasing rivalry (1945–1963)
After the end of the second World War, football quickly became popular again in the population. Already in 1945, the American allied administration allowed the foundation of the Oberliga Süd. As this league, in contrast to the previous Gauliga Bayern, also included teams from Hesse and Baden-Württemberg, Bayern and 1860 became the only two clubs from Munich which resulted in an increased rivalry. Other Munich-based teams declined in importance. In this period, both teams could hardly point to successes with the exception of Bayern's victory in the 1957 German Cup.

Struggle for domination (1963–1970)
The regulations by the German football federation for the inaugural Bundesliga season stipulated that only one team from one city should be promoted. Due to opaque rules, Bayern instead of 1860 was forced to play in the second tier. 1860 won the German Cup in this season, followed by a successful European campaign leading to European Cup Winners' Cup final which was lost to West Ham United. In Bayern's season of promotion Munich became the football capital of Germany: 1860 clinched their first Bundesliga title whereas Bayern won the German Cup final. After that, the conditions began to turn: While 1860 gained the second place in the Bundesliga, Bayern defended the German Cup and won the European Cup Winners' Cup in Nuremberg. In 1969, Bayern captured their first German double whereas 1860 slipped to the 10th position. One year later, 1860 relegated from the Bundesliga.

Bayern's golden years, 1860's decline (1970–1994)
With 1860's relegation, the relative strengths now completely turned to Bayern. After moving from Grünwalder Stadion to the much larger Olympiastadion, Bayern's golden years began. Three German championships (1972–1974) followed by three victorious European campaigns (1974–1976) marked the most successful period in Bayern's history. While Bayern became established in the Bundesliga, 1860 became a yo-yo club. Until 1999, the last derby won by 1860 was in 1977. Even in the frequently played friendlies, Bayern mostly kept the upper hand.

Bundesliga return of 1860 (1994–2004)
After 13 years mainly spent in the Bayernliga, 1860 promoted again to the top flight in 1994. In the previous season, Bayern clinched their 13th Bundesliga title. In 1999, 1860 won their first derby since 22 years. After also the return match was won, Bayern regained its leadership role again with some very high wins (5–1 in 2001 and 5–0 in 2003). Due to the successful application of the German football federation for the 2006 FIFA World Cup in June 2000, both club's forced the idea of ground-share in a new stadium.

Ground-sharing in the Allianz Arena (2005–2017)

One year before the clubs moved to the Allianz Arena, 1860 relegated to the 2. Fußball-Bundesliga again. Since then, in addition to three friendly matches, only one competitive game was held. Just one day before the match was held, unknown Bayern fans painted parts of the Grünwalder Stadion, 1860 traditional home stadium, in the club colors of Bayern, red and white.

Munich 1860 were relegated to 3. Liga at the conclusion of the 2016-17 season.

1860's Return to Grünwalder Stadion (2017–)
On 2 June 2017, it was announced that 1860 were unable to obtain a 3. Liga license for the 2017–18 season as a result of investor Hassan Ismaik's unwillingness to pay the necessary fees. As a result, the club was relegated to the Regionalliga Bayern for the 2017–18 season. Following these events, which meant that Bayern Munich would be ground sharing with the now amateur status 1860, on 12 July 2017 Bayern Munich announced that the ground sharing arrangement with 1860 had come to an end. Shortly thereafter, Munich 1860 announced that the club would return to its traditional grounds at Stadion an der Grünwalder Straße for the 2017-18 season. Following relegation to the Regionalliga, 1860 will play matches with FC Bayern Munich II.

All-time results

Overall match statistics

Results involving reserve teams
With the two senior teams playing in different leagues the meetings between the two reserve sides of the clubs, nowadays in the tier four Regionalliga Bayern, have received increased attention. The most recent derbies have attracted almost capacity crowds of 12,500 in the Grünwalder Stadium, but also made heavy police presence necessary to deal with the rival fan fractions. The games have also, on occasion, been broadcast live on television.

The games of the reserve sides of the two clubs since the introduction of the Regionalligas in 1994:

The games between first team of 1860 Munich and reserve side of Bayern Munich:

References

FC Bayern Munich
TSV 1860 Munich
Association football rivalries in Germany
Football in Munich